The Superettan 2010 was the tenth season of Sweden's second-tier football league. The season began on 10 April 2010 and ended on 23 October 2010.

The top 2 teams qualified directly for promotion to Allsvenskan, the third played a play-off against the fourteenth from Allsvenskan to decide who qualified to play in Allsvenskan 2011.
The bottom 2 teams qualified directly for relegation to Division 1, the thirteenth and the fourteenth played a play-off against the numbers two from Division 1 Södra and Division 1 Norra to decide who qualified to play in Superettan 2011.

Participating teams

League table

Results

Relegation play-offs 

The 13th and 14th placed teams in the 2010 Superettan, Jönköpings Södra and Öster, plays against the runners up from the 2010 Division 1, Sirius and Qviding.

Jönköpings Södra and Öster stayed in Superettan.

Sirius stayed in Division 1. Qviding were promoted as Örgryte went bankrupt and were demoted.

Season statistics

Top scorers

Top assists

Top goalkeepers 
(Minimum of 10 games played)

Attendances 

Source: svenskfotboll.se

References

External links 
 
 Superettan 

Superettan seasons
2
Sweden
Sweden